The Erpe is a tributary of Spree River in Brandenburg and Berlin, Germany.
The upper third is also known als Langes Elsenfließ ("Long Lizzy-Flow"), the lower two thirds for about half a century were noted as Neuenhagener Mühlenfließ. Previously they had been one of several Mühlenfließe ("Mill Flow"s) without a specification. The course itself is quite natural, but it suffers pollution from a purification plant.

See also
List of rivers of Brandenburg

Rivers of Brandenburg
Rivers of Germany